Styrophyton is a monotypic genus of flowering plants belonging to the family Melastomataceae. The only species is Styrophyton caudatum.

Its native range is Southern China.

References

Melastomataceae
Melastomataceae genera
Monotypic Myrtales genera